Giera is a commune in Timiș County, Romania. It is composed of three villages: Giera (commune seat), Grănicerii and Toager.

History 

At the 1717 census, in Giera there were 12 houses inhabited by Serbs and an Orthodox church (built since 1667). They settled here during the 17th century. In 1829, Lukács Gyertyánffy built a mansion in Giera, near the grain storehouse (now a historical monument), built in turn by Andor Gyertyánffy; the mansion is preserved to this day. The Gyertyánffys also owned a grove called Gradinaț, where an Avar ring and a Turkish fortress were later unearthed.

Demographics 

Giera had a population of 1,239 inhabitants at the 2011 census, down 6% from the 2002 census. Most inhabitants are Romanians (65.54%), larger minorities being represented by Hungarians (17.03%), Roma (7.99%), Serbs (4.52%) and Germans (1.69%). For 2.99% of the population, ethnicity is unknown. By religion, most inhabitants are Orthodox (68.2%), but there are also minorities of Roman Catholics (20.82%), Serbian Orthodox (4.44%), Pentecostals (1.29%) and Baptists (1.13%). For 2.99% of the population, religious affiliation is unknown.

References 

Communes in Timiș County
Localities in Romanian Banat